Penicillium rolfsii is a species of fungus in the genus Penicillium which produces patulin.

References

Further reading 
 
 

rolfsii
Fungi described in 1930
Taxa named by Charles Thom